The Baojun Yep is a battery electric crossover city car manufactured by SAIC-GM-Wuling (SGMW) since 2023 under the Baojun brand.

History
In February 2023, the Chinese joint-venture SAIC-GM-Wuling introduced a new small city car in the form of a combination of a 3-door hatchback with features reminiscent of large off-road vehicles. The result was the Baojun Yep crossover.

The Yep is distinguished by its angular silhouette with clearly defined wheel arches, black bumpers and sill covers, as well as an imitation spare wheel on the trunk lid. The vehicle also uses full LED lighting, with a characteristic arrangement of stripes in the front covers. In addition, despite its small external dimensions, the Yep is a 4-seater car that can accommodate 2 passengers in each row of seats, which has been achieved with a length of less than 3.4 meters.

The Yep was created for the dynamically developing electric car market in China in mind, with the start of sales scheduled for May 2023, just after the official presentation to the public at the 2023 Shanghai Auto Show.

Specifications
The Yep is an electric car, which in the basic variant is powered by an electric motor located at the rear axle, which develops 67 hp and 140 Nm of maximum torque. The iron-phosphate battery allows the user to drive about 303 kilometers on a single charge in urban conditions according to the CLTC measurement cycle.

References

Yep
Electric city cars
Mini sport utility vehicles
Crossover sport utility vehicles
Cars introduced in 2023